Bernard John "Tug" Willson (20 June 1935 - 14 February 1997) was an English former first-class cricketer and Royal Air Force officer.

Willson was born in June 1935 at Strood, Kent. He joined the Royal Air Force in February 1961, when he was commissioned as a cadet pilot. He was promoted to the rank of pilot officer in February 1962, with promotion to the rank of flying officer coming in February 1963, with seniority antedated to December 1961. He was selected to play for the Combined Services cricket team in 1964, making two first-class appearances against Cambridge University at Uxbridge, and Oxford University at Aldershot. He scored 87 runs in his two matches, with a high score of 53 against Oxford University. With his left-arm medium pace bowling, he took 7 wickets at a bowling average of 28.14 and best figures of 4 for 87. He was promoted to the rank of flight lieutenant in April 1966, with promotion to the rank of squadron leader in January 1972. Willson retired from active service in January 1975. He then moved to Hong Kong where he flew for Cathay Pacific and played cricket for Little Sai Wan as well as representing Hong Kong.

References

External links

1935 births
1997 deaths
People from Strood
Royal Air Force officers
English cricketers
Combined Services cricketers